The fourth season of The Secret Life of the American Teenager, an American television series created by Brenda Hampton, debuted on the ABC Family television network on Monday, June 13, 2011, at 8:00 PM. During its third season's hiatus, ABC Family announced on January 10, 2011, that the show would be renewed for a fourth season. The fourth season premiered on June 13, 2011, one week after the season 3 finale. The second half of the season premiered on March 26, 2012. On February 2, 2012, ABC Family announced that Secret Life was being renewed for a fifth and final season.

Main cast 

 Shailene Woodley as Amy Juergens
 Kenny Baumann as Ben Boykewich
 Mark Derwin as George Juergens
 India Eisley as Ashley Juergens
 Greg Finley as Jack Pappas
 Daren Kagasoff as Ricky Underwood
 Megan Park as Grace Bowman
 Francia Raisa as Adrian Lee
 Steven R. Schirripa as Leo Boykewich
 Molly Ringwald as Anne Juergens

Episodes

References

External links
Official website

2011 American television seasons
4
2012 American television seasons